Henry Redwood (24 January 1823 – 9 November 1907) was a New Zealand farmer, politician and racehorse breeder.

Biography 
He was born in Tixall, Staffordshire, England in 1823. He was a brother of Francis Redwood, a brother in law of Joseph Ward, and an uncle of Vernon Redwood. He lived at Stafford Place in Appleby near Richmond. He was a member of the Nelson Provincial Council from 1863 and of the Marlborough Provincial Council from 1868.

Racehorses

Henry Redwood was prominent in the thoroughbred racing industry.  He was called the 'Father of the New Zealand Turf' and established a stud at Hednesford, likely the first in New Zealand. He imported the stallion, Sir Hercules, along with other bloodstock from Australia and France.

His wins included:

 On 4 March 1863 his mare, Ladybird, won the first New Zealand Champion Race against horses from Australia and New Zealand.
 the Wellington Cup twice: Korari in 1876 and Guy Fawkes in 1877.
 the Dunedin Cup with Lurline in 1874.
 the Canterbury Jockey Club Handicap (which later became the New Zealand Cup): Peeress (1871), Kakapo (1873), Guy Fawkes (1876) and Mata (1877).
 the Canterbury Derby with Manuka (1869), Papapa (1873) and Songster (1876).
 the Nelson Cup with Clogs (1885), Alpine Rose (1886) and Awarua Rose (1892).
 the Marlborough Cup.

He was a steward for the Nelson Jockey Club from 1848.Henry Redwood also raced in partnership with Hugh Stafford, and later with George Stead.

His racing colours were a black jacket and red cap.  These were also carried on by son, Joseph.

Henry Redwood was inducted into the New Zealand Racing Hall of Fame in 2008 and he was the great great uncle of fellow member Murray Baker.

References

1823 births
1907 deaths
New Zealand racehorse owners and breeders
New Zealand farmers
People from the Borough of Stafford
English emigrants to New Zealand
Unsuccessful candidates in the 1871 New Zealand general election
Members of the Marlborough Provincial Council
Members of the Nelson Provincial Council
New Zealand Racing Hall of Fame inductees